Henry Keene was a Republican legislator in the U.S. state of Oregon, first elected in Marion County in June 1900. He was born in Saxony in 1830 and moved to New York, Minnesota, before moving to Oregon in 1870. His wife was also a native of Germany; they had 13 children.

References 

Members of the Oregon Legislative Assembly
People from Marion County, Oregon
German emigrants to the United States